Brian Samuel Hall (9 March 1939 – September 2002) was an English footballer who played for Mansfield Town and Colchester United between 1958 and 1973.
  
Hall made 361 appearances and scored 38 goals in eight years with Colchester. Originally an attacking left-side player, he spent much of his career as a left-back known for his dribbling skill when overlapping down the left wing. He was a great crowd favourite and was inducted into the club's Hall of Fame. After football, he ran a local sports shop with Ray Crawford that lasted for only two years. He died in September 2002 at the age of 63.

References

External links
 League stats at Neil Brown's site
 Player stats at coludata.co.uk

1939 births
2002 deaths
English footballers
Association football defenders
Belper Town F.C. players
Mansfield Town F.C. players
Colchester United F.C. players
Chelmsford City F.C. players
Wimbledon F.C. players
English Football League players
People from Burbage, Leicestershire
Footballers from Leicestershire